Laura Johanna van 't Veer (born 1957) is a Dutch molecular biologist and clinical molecular geneticist. She is group leader molecular pathology for the Department of Pathology and Division of Experimental Therapy of The Netherlands Cancer Institute.

Education 
She attended the University of Amsterdam from 1976 to 1984 and received a B.Sc. in biology and M.Sc. in molecular oncology. She continued her studies at the University of Leiden from 1984 to 1989. She would earn her PhD focusing on the study of oncogene activation and tumorigenesis.

Career 
In 2003, van 't Veer cofounded Agendia B.V. in 2003, serving as the chief operating officer of Agendia B.V. until June 12, 2007. She continues her work with the company today as chief research officer.  She was featured in the cover story of the May–June 2006 issue of Cancer World.  With her colleagues in the field, she has been awarded a number of patents related to cancer treatment.  She has been a member of the Science Policy and Government Affairs Committee of the American Association for Cancer Research since 2014. From 2013 to 2014, she was a member of the Education and Training Committee.  She has more than 80 peer reviewed publications to her name.

Awards and merits 
IARC Medal of Honor, Lyon, France in 2005
Van der Scheuren award lecture for European Breast Cancer Research, EBCC5 in 2006.
ESMO Lifetime Achievement Award for Translational Research in Breast Cancer in 2007
Breast Cancer Research Fund (BCRF-Pink Ribbon US) grant award in 2007 and 2008
Delivered the First Annual Harry and Edith Gladstein Award, Indiana University, School of Medicine on April 7, 2009, titled "Molecular Profiles of Breast and Colorectal Cancer in Patient Management" 
 European Inventor Award, in 2015 for her gene-based breast cancer test.
Giants of Cancer Care Award in 2020 for cancer diagnostics

References

External links
UCSF: Laura Van 'T Veer publications
Laura Van 'T Veer's publication list

1957 births
Living people
University of Amsterdam alumni
Leiden University alumni
Dutch biologists
Dutch geneticists
Dutch oncologists